Thomas Joseph (Tom) Bowles is an American nuclear physicist who works at the Los Alamos National Laboratory.    He served as the Laboratory's Chief Science Officer from 2004 to 2006, and also was science advisor to New Mexico Governor Bill Richardson from 2006.

Bowles received his B.Sc. degree at the University of Colorado in 1973 and his Ph.D. at Princeton University in 1978. He joined the Physics Division at Los Alamos in 1979 and was named a Fellow of the Laboratory in 1994. 

He was elected a Fellow of the American Physical Society in 1992  and awarded the M. A. Markov Prize by the Russian Academy of Sciences' Institute for Nuclear Research in 2003.

See also
Russian American Gallium Experiment (SAGE).

References

External links
 Press release about Tom Bowles receiving the M. A. Markov Prize.
 a picture of Tom Bowles

American nuclear physicists
University of Colorado alumni
Princeton University alumni
Living people
Los Alamos National Laboratory personnel
Year of birth missing (living people)
Fellows of the American Physical Society